Block 181 is an Italian drama television series created for Sky. The series is set in Milan and follows a ménage à trois between two men and a woman.

References

External links
 

2020s crime drama television series
2020s LGBT-related drama television series
2022 Italian television series debuts
Gay-related television shows
Television shows filmed in Italy
Male bisexuality in fiction